Buckland may refer to:

People
Buckland (surname)

Places

Australia
 Buckland, Queensland, a rural locality in the Central Highlands Region
 Buckland, Tasmania, a rural locality
 Buckland County, New South Wales
 Buckland River (Victoria)
 Buckland Military Training Area, Tasmania

Canada
Rural Municipality of Buckland No. 491, Saskatchewan

United Kingdom
Buckland, Buckinghamshire, a village and civil parish
Buckland, Devon, two places: a village and a suburb of Newton Abbot
Buckland, Gloucestershire, a village and civil parish
Buckland, New Forest, Hampshire
Buckland, Portsmouth, Hampshire, a residential area of the city of Portsmouth
Buckland, Hertfordshire, a village and civil parish
Buckland, Kent, a village
Buckland, Oxfordshire, a village and civil parish
Buckland, Surrey, a village and civil parish

United States
 Buckland, Alaska, a city
 Buckland River, Alaska
 Buckland, Massachusetts, a town
 Buckland, Ohio, a village
 Buckland, Virginia, an unincorporated community

Elsewhere
 Monte Buckland, a mountain in the Chilean part of Tierra del Fuego
 Buckland, New Zealand, a village (also two other places)
 Buckland Hill, Wales

Arts and entertainment
 Buckland (Middle-earth), fictional place in The Lord of the Rings
 Buckland's Auction House, fictional workplace of Prue Halliwell in the television series Charmed

Other uses
 Buckland, Braunton, North Devon, England, a historic estate
 Buckland (Buckland, North Carolina), a historic plantation house
 Buckland Station, a stagecoach station and hotel near Stagecoach, Nevada
 Buckland railway station, a former station on the North Island Main Trunk in New Zealand
 Baron Buckland, an extinct title held only by Seymour Berry, 1st Baron Buckland (1877–1928)
 Buckland Foundation, a charity endowed through the estate of Francis Trevelyan Buckland

See also
 Places in England:
 Buckland Brewer, Devon
 Buckland Common, Buckinghamshire
 Buckland Dinham, Somerset
 Buckland Filleigh, Devon
 Buckland-in-the-Moor, Devon
 Buckland Monachorum, Devon
 Buckland Newton, Dorset
 Buckland St Mary, Somerset
 East Buckland, Devon
 West Buckland, Devon 
 West Buckland, Somerset
 Buckland Beacon, Dartmoor, Devon
 Buckland Hospital, Kent
 Buckland House, Oxfordshire
 Buckland Abbey, Devon
 Buckland Priory, Somerset
 Buckland Windmill, Surrey